Psaltoda mossi is a species of cicada native to the vicinity of Cairns in northeastern Australia.

References

External links

Hemiptera of Australia
Insects described in 2002
Psaltodini